Jacques Laurent or Jacques Laurent-Cély (6 January 1919 – 28 December 2000) was a French writer and journalist. He was born in Paris, the son of a barrister. During World War II, he fought with the Algerian Tirailleurs.

Laurent was elected to the Académie française in 1986.

Laurent belonged to the literary group of the Hussards, and is known as a prolific historical novelist, essay writer, and screenwriter under the pen name of Cecil Saint-Laurent. The 1955 film Lola Montès, directed by Max Ophüls, was based on his historic novel based on the life of Lola Montez. He wrote Jean Aurel's Oscar-nominated 1963 World War I documentary, 14-18. He also directed the film Quarante-huit heures d'amour/48 Hours of Love (1969).

Another noteworthy novel by Saint-Laurent was Darling Caroline (written in 1947), a powerful book set in the early days of the French Revolution. This also became a film. This was released in France in 1951, directed by Jean-Devaivre and starring Martine Carol in the title role. Saint-Laurent was one of the scriptwriters of the film.

The 1961 "Les Passagers pour Alger" (translated to English as "Algerian Adventure") was a contemporary thriller, set against the background of the then raging Algerian War, and like many of his books written from the point of view of adventurous, daring young woman.

Laurent received the Prix Goncourt in 1971 for his novel Les Bêtises.

Revolutionary  insurgent Ukrainian  Anarchist and ally of Nestor Makhno appears in the novel "Clarisse", by Cecil Saint-Laurent.

Bibliography 
As Jacques Laurent

As J.C Laurent

As Cecil Saint-Laurent

As Albéric Varenne
 1948 : Quand la France occupait l'Europe (éditions le Portulan)

Other pseudonyms Laurent Labattut, Gilles Bargy, Dupont de Mena, Luc d’Ébreuil, Roland de Jarnèze, Alain Nazelle, Jean Parquin, Gonzague de Pont-Royal, Marc de Saint-Palais, Alain de Sudy, Edgar Vuymont.

Filmography 
 Quay of Grenelle, directed by Emil-Edwin Reinert (1950, based on the novel La Mort à boire)
Dear Caroline, directed by Richard Pottier (1951, based on the novel Caroline Chérie)
, directed by Jean Devaivre (1953, based on the novel Les Caprices de Caroline)
, directed by Carmine Gallone and Renzo Merusi (1954, based on the novel La Fille de Mata-Hari)
Caroline and the Rebels, directed by Jean Devaivre (1955, based on the novel Le Fils de Caroline chérie)
Frou-Frou, directed by Augusto Genina (1955, based on the novel Frou-Frou)
, directed by Pierre Gaspard-Huit (1955, based on the novel Sophie et le crime)
Bad Liaisons, directed by Alexandre Astruc (1955, based on the novel Une sacrée salade)
Lola Montès, directed by Max Ophüls (1955, based on the novel La Vie Extraordinaire de Lola Montes)
, directed by Denys de La Patellière (1968, based on the novel Caroline Chérie)

Screenwriter 
 1953: Lucrèce Borgia, directed by Christian-Jaque
 1956: Maid in Paris, directed by Pierre Gaspard-Huit
 1959: Le secret du Chevalier d'Éon, directed by Jacqueline Audry
 1962: Le Masque de fer, directed by Henri Decoin
 1963: 14-18, directed by Jean Aurel
 1964: All About Loving, directed by Jean Aurel
 1967: Sept hommes et une garce, directed by Bernard Borderie
 1967: Lamiel, directed by Jean Aurel
 1968: Manon 70, directed by Jean Aurel
 1969: , directed by Jacques Laurent
 1969: Les Femmes, directed by Jean Aurel

References

External links

Obituary http://findarticles.com/p/articles/mi_qn4158/is_20010101/ai_n9662871/pg_1?tag=artBody;col1

1919 births
2000 deaths
Writers from Paris
20th-century French essayists
French male screenwriters
French screenwriters
Lycée Condorcet alumni
Members of the Académie Française
People affiliated with Action Française
French military personnel of World War II
Prix Goncourt winners
20th-century French novelists
French male essayists
French male novelists
Grand prix Jean Giono recipients
20th-century French male writers
2000 suicides
20th-century French screenwriters